Cara Black and Liezel Huber were the defending champions, but did not play together. Black partnered with Rennae Stubbs and Huber partnered with Martina Navratilova but both pairs lost to Yan Zi and Zheng Jie, in the semifinals and quarterfinals respectively.

Yan and Zheng defeated Virginia Ruano Pascual and Paola Suárez in the final, 6–3, 3–6, 6–2 to win the ladies' doubles tennis title at the 2006 Wimbledon Championships. With their loss in the final, Ruano Pascual and Suárez missed the chance of completing the career Grand Slam.

Seeds

  Lisa Raymond /  Samantha Stosur (third round)
  Cara Black /  Rennae Stubbs (semifinals)
  Daniela Hantuchová /  Ai Sugiyama (first round)
  Yan Zi /  Zheng Jie (champions)
  Anna-Lena Grönefeld /  Meghann Shaughnessy (quarterfinals)
  Shinobu Asagoe /  Katarina Srebotnik (first round)
  Liezel Huber /  Martina Navratilova (quarterfinals)
  Elena Dementieva /  Flavia Pennetta (third round)
  Květa Peschke /  Francesca Schiavone (quarterfinals)
  Eleni Daniilidou /  Anabel Medina Garrigues (quarterfinals)
  Elena Likhovtseva /  Anastasia Myskina (third round)
  Svetlana Kuznetsova /  Amélie Mauresmo (second round)
  Li Ting /  Sun Tiantian (first round)
  Émilie Loit /  Nicole Pratt (first round)
  Nathalie Dechy /  Gisela Dulko (first round)
  Marion Bartoli /  Shahar Pe'er (second round)

Qualifying

Draw

Finals

Top half

Section 1

Section 2

Bottom half

Section 3

Section 4

References

External links

2006 Wimbledon Championships on WTAtennis.com
2006 Wimbledon Championships – Women's draws and results at the International Tennis Federation

Women's Doubles
Wimbledon Championship by year – Women's doubles
Wimbledon Championships
Wimbledon Championships